The Men's Super G competition of the Calgary 1988 Olympics was held at Nakiska on Sunday, February 21. This was the Olympic debut of the event.

The defending world champion was Pirmin Zurbriggen of Switzerland, who was also the defending World Cup Super G champion and led the current season.

France's Franck Piccard won the gold medal, Helmut Mayer of Austria took the silver, and Lars-Börje Eriksson of Sweden was the bronze medalist. Zurbriggen tied for fifth, more than two seconds behind. Italy's Alberto Tomba lasted three gates and did not finish. It was the first Olympic alpine gold for France in twenty years, since the sweep by Jean-Claude Killy in 1968.

Results
The race was started at 10:00 local time, (UTC  −7).

References

External links
FIS results

Men's Super G
Winter Olympics